Valerie Tourgay (Vorobyov; Russian: Валерий Владимирович Тургай (Воробьёв); born April 17, 1961, Pochinok-Ineli, Komsomolsky District, Chuvash ASSR, USSR) is a Chuvash poet, novelist, translator, and journalist.

 (2003), member of the Union of Soviet Writers (1991), Chairman of the Chuvash Republican Public Charitable Foundation M. Sespel (after 1996).

Biography 
The future poet was born April 17, 1961 in the village of Pochinok-Ineli, Komsomolsky District of the Chuvash ASSR.

He received higher education at the Chuvash State University named after I. N. Ulyanov, in the Higher Theater Courses at the A.V. Lunacharsky GITIS.

He received higher education at the Chuvash State University named after I. N. Ulyanov, in the Higher Theater Courses at the A.V. Lunacharsky GITIS.

Works 
 «Шурă фарфăр чашăк»/ "White porcelain cup", Poem, Cheboksary, 1994.
 «Чунăм манăн, чунăм…» / "My soul, my soul", Poem, Cheboksary, 2003
 «Ночь-мелодия» / "Night-melody", Poem, Cheboksary, 2004.
 «Моя бунтарская карма»/ "My rebellious Karma", articles, interviews, Cheboksary, 2011.
 «Ку эпӗ» /"It's Me" Poem, Cheboksary, 2013.

Literature 
 Валери Туркай. Чӑваш халӑх поэчӗ : [буклет]. — Шупашкар : [и. ҫ.], 2013. — 1 с.
 Туркай, В. Пурнатпӑр-ха! : чӑваш халӑх поэчӗ Валери Туркай = Будем жить! : народный поэт Чувашии Валери Тургай / [В. Туркай] ; Николай Григорьев [пухса хатӗрленӗ]. — Чебоксары : [Новое Время], 2012. — 409 с.
 Тургай Валерий Владимирович, народный поэт Чувашии [Электронный ресурс] : [интервью с народным поэтом Чувашии Валери Тургаем]. — Электрон. текстовые дан. — [Б. м.] : Персональный сайт, 2011. Режим доступа : http://mosentesh2.ucoz.ru/publ/valerij_turgaj_poeht/1-1-0-482.
 Данилова, Л. Утăм хыççан утăм / Л. Данилова // Ялав. — 2005. No. 3.
 Зайцева, В. Салам сана, Турӑ кайӑкӗ! / В. Зайцева // Каçал ен. — 2011. — 16 апрель (No. 42/43).
 Кузнецова, В. Мĕнпе илӗртет В. Туркай / В. Кузнецова // Çамрăксен хаçачĕ. — 2000. — юпа (No. 40).
 Кузнецова, В. Туркай поэзийĕ тата вулакан / В. Кузнецова // Тăван Атăл. — 2000. — No. 9.
 Метин, П. Поэзи тӗнчи — тӗпсӗр авӑр / П. Метин // Тӑван Атӑл. — 2011. — No. 4.
 Прокопьева, Р. Чӑваш халӑх поэчӗн портретне кам ӳкернӗ-ши? / Р. Прокопьева // Самант. — 2011. — No. 5. — С. 18.
 Смирнова, Н. Халӑхсен «ылтӑн пӗрчипе» пуянланнӑ кӗнеке / Н. Смирнова ; В. Кузьмин сӑн ӳкерчӗкӗ // Хыпар. — 2015. — 28 январь/кӑрлач. — С. 2.
 Теветкел, Н. «Пришибаев унтера хирĕç кар тăнă унтерсем» ярăмран: [Валери Туркай поэтăн творчестви пирки] / Н. Теветкел // Çамрăксен хаçачĕ. — 2005. — 11 нарăс (No. 5) ; 18 нарăс (No. 6).
 Тургай, В. В. «Туркай та тӗрлӗрен пурнать…», Самант, 2007, No. 3.
 Афанасьев, П. Тургай Валери (Тургай Валерий Владимирович), Писатели Чувашии, Чебоксары, 2006.
 Вадимов, В. Наш человек в «Дружбе народов» / В. Вадимов // Совет. Чувашия. — 2007. — 20 дек. — С. 6-15.
 Матвеева, Г. Дагестан далекий и близкий / Г. Матвеева // Совет. Чувашия. — 2006. — 16 сент
 Семенндер, Ю. С. Валерий Владимирович Тургай: 1961. На новой волне, Писатели. — Чебоксары, 2008.
 Тимуков, А. Н. Тургай Валери / А. Н. Тимуков, Краткая чувашская энциклопедия, Чебоксары, 2001.
 Тургай (Воробьев) Валерий Владимирович, Энциклопедия Комсомольского района, Чебоксары, 2009.
 Тургай (Воробьев) Валерий Владимирович, Энциклопедия чувашской журналистики и печати, Чебоксары, 2014.
 «Хыпар» возглавит Валерий Тургай : [о назначении на должность главного редактора АУ "Издательский дом «Хыпар» Валерия Тургая], Совет. Чувашия (гахета), 2014, 25 октября.
 Ялгир, П. Тургай Валерий Владимирович, Литературный мир Чувашии, Чебоксары, 2005.

References

External links 
 Valerie Tourgay wrote a letter to Oleg Nikolaevu because at the celebration of the Day of Cultural Workers, not a word was spoken in Chuvash.
 Visiting the people's poet of Chuvashia Valerie Tourgay

Chuvash writers
Russian activists
Chuvash-language poets
20th-century translators
Chuvash State University alumni
Soviet translators
Russian translators
20th-century Russian poets
Folk poets of Chuvashia
1961 births
2014 deaths

ba:Тургай Валерий Владимирович
cv:Туркай Валери Владимирович
ru:Тургай, Валерий Владимирович
tt:Валерий Тургай